F.C. Union Pro Mogliano-Preganziol A.S.D., commonly referred to as Union Pro, is an Italian football club based in Mogliano Veneto and Preganziol, Veneto. Currently it plays in Italy's Serie D.

History

Foundation
The club was founded in 2012 after the merger of A.S.D. Pro Mogliano Calcio (founded in 1928) and ASD Union Preganziol (founded in 1962).

Serie D
In the season 2013–14 the team was promoted for the first time, from Eccellenza Veneto/B to Serie D.

Colors and badge
The team's colors are white and blue.

References

External links
 Official homepage

Football clubs in Italy
Football clubs in Veneto
Association football clubs established in 2012
2012 establishments in Italy